America – People and Places, known earlier under the name America – The Freedom to Be and USA & Canada – The Freedom to Be, is a German English-language learning course in the form of a 13-part television series presenting the history of select states in the United States and provinces in Canada. The series explores the current situation of politics, education, sports, and freedoms in these states and provinces through interviews with different people living in the United States and Canada. The course is presented entirely in English.

Produced by WDR, the program is an extension of its Fast Track English series.

The series was also shown in the German educational television program Planet Schule

States and Provinces Covered 

 40. Massachusetts 
 41. Pennsylvania 
 42. Illinois 
 43. Washington D.C. 
 44. Kentucky 
 45. South Carolina 
 46. Georgia 
 47. Florida
 48. Quebec
 49. Ontario
 50. Alberta
 51. British Columbia
 52. Nova Scotia

See also
List of German television series

Book 
The book version of the series is titled America – People and Places.

Audio Cassette 
Two audio cassettes are listed under the title America – People and Places.

External links 
 America – The Freedom to Be on Planet Schule
 Official internet site of America – People and Places

German educational television series
English-language education television programming
Geography education
German television spin-offs